The Scottish Monarchs were a motorcycle speedway team based in Glasgow, Scotland.

At the end of the 1995 season, the Glasgow Tigers closed due to a lack of finance and the Edinburgh Monarchs lost their home track, Powderhall Stadium, to redevelopment, leading to the Monarchs racing at Shawfield Stadium in Glasgow during the 1996 season under the guise of the Scottish Monarchs.

Despite having the first rider to compete in the Speedway Grand Prix while a member of a Scottish speedway team, Stefano Alfonso, the team were poorly supported by fans of both the original clubs. 

In 1997 the Monarchs moved back east to Armadale Stadium, where they continue to race, while Glasgow Tigers returned to racing in Glasgow.

British speedway teams
Sports teams in Glasgow
Defunct British speedway teams